Danuta Konkalec (born 7 September 1955) is a Polish rower. She competed in the women's eight event at the 1976 Summer Olympics.

References

1955 births
Living people
Polish female rowers
Olympic rowers of Poland
Rowers at the 1976 Summer Olympics
Sportspeople from Pomeranian Voivodeship
People from Puck County